Tyr: Myth—Culture—Tradition is the name of an American Radical Traditionalist (anti-modern, neo-tribalist) journal, edited by Joshua Buckley, Michael Moynihan, and (in the first issue) Collin Cleary.

History and profile
Tyr is published annually. It is named for Tyr, the Germanic god. The magazine states that it "celebrates the traditional myths, culture, and social institutions of pre-Christian, pre-modern Europe." One editor, Buckley, is a business associate and protege of the extreme right lawyer Sam Dickson, according to the Southern Poverty Law Center.

The first issue was published in 2002 under the ULTRA imprint in Atlanta, Georgia. The magazine largely focuses on topics relating to Germanic neopaganism and Germanic paganism with an amount of content regarding Celtic polytheism as well. As described by Benjamin R. Teitelbaum, Tyr "contextualized Traditionalism within an implicitly nativistic worldview championing white European ethnicities".

Four volumes, in 2002, 2004, 2006 and 2014, were published by Norway's Integral Publications, one in 2018 by Arcana Europa Media. Contributors include Asatru Folk Assembly founder Stephen McNallen, Nouvelle Droite leader Alain de Benoist, British musicologist and translator Joscelyn Godwin, modern Germanic mysticist Nigel Pennick and scholar Stephen Flowers. The journal has also published translations of older works, such as by occultist Julius Evola and völkisch poet and musician Hermann Löns.

A brief 2004 review in Willamette Week of the second issue said that "It's hard not to find the recurrent interest in a posited tribal "homogeneity" a little discomfiting (indeed, a section of this issue's preface attempts to dismiss "The Fascist Accusation" before the fact)", and summarized the journal as "a first-class artifact of, ironically, modern Bohemia".

Michael Strmiska, writing for the Pagan Studies journal The Pomegranate in 2010 reviewed the first three issues.  According to Strmiska, the Tyr was eclectic and "difficult to categorize". Strmiska also addressed the political content of Tyr, specifically saying the journal was not pro-fascist or neo-Nazi.

See also
Traditionalist School
Development criticism

References

External links
 Tyr official site

2002 establishments in the United States
Annual magazines published in the United States
Cultural magazines published in the United States
Fascist newspapers and magazines
English-language magazines
Germanic mysticism
Magazines established in 2002
Magazines published in Atlanta
Modern pagan magazines
Modern paganism in the United States
Political magazines published in the United States
Traditionalist School
2000s in modern paganism